Malaysian Advancement Party (abbrev: MAP) is a political party representing the Indian community in Malaysia.

Formation
MAP was founded by the ex Minister in the Prime Minister's Department in charge of National Unity and Social Wellbeing and founding chairman of Hindu Rights Action Force (HINDRAF), P. Waytha Moorthy. It was submitted for registration by its pro-tem committee to the Registrar of Societies in September 2018. Waytha Moorthy announced the party is officially formed as on 16 July 2019 and registered with the RoS. He also declared he quits his position in HINDRAF due to the formation of the new party and to focus his leadership on MAP.

The Party's main objectives amongst others are to protect, promote and advance the interests of the Malaysian Indian community's political, economic, educational, cultural, religious and social interests. MAP as new political party, hopes to ensure an effective representation of the Malaysian Indian community and their interests are protected and advanced. Its direction and vision are to adopt a fundamental rights-based approach for advancement, progressively moving away from state-assisted, welfare and hand-out based community towards community empowerment and resilient. The values that MAP propagates include inclusiveness, equality, quality, originality, integrity, and transparency within the government. The party has stated it will work and cooperate with all political parties in Pakatan Harapan to enhance the reform agenda under the new PH administration and Malaysia Baharu government.

The formation of MAP as an ethnic based political party had invited mix reaction, criticism and concern from certain quarters regarding the Indian community unity and non-communal policies pushed by the PH coalition.

On 26 October 2022, MAP announced support for Barisan Nasional ahead of the 15th general election 15 (GE15). MAP President P Waytha Moorthy said he wants to complete his mission to help  Malaysian Indian community.

Elected representatives

Dewan Negara (Senate)

Senators

See also 
 Politics of Malaysia
 List of political parties in Malaysia

References

External link 
 
 HINDRAF - 

Political parties in Malaysia
Political parties established in 2019
2019 establishments in Malaysia
Conservative parties in Malaysia
Political parties of minorities
Identity politics
Indian-Malaysian culture